Pearrygin Lake is a  reservoir lying  northeast of Winthrop in Okanogan County, Washington. The lake is fed by a diversion from the Chewuch River and several small inlets; it drains westerly into the Chewuch River. It lies within the watershed of the Lower Chewuch River.

The lake is oriented from northwest to southeast in a narrow, glacially carved valley where it abuts a forested slope to the south and open shrub-steppe habitat to the north. It is located in Section 36, Township 35N, Range 21E. The lake is almost entirely surrounded by Pearrygin Lake State Park. A privately-owned RV camping resort occupies the lake's northern shore. The lake's primary sports fish is rainbow trout.

History
The lake bears the name of B.F. "Ben" Pearrygin, who homesteaded the area in the late 1880s. The lake became a reservoir intended for irrigation and recreational purposes with the completion of a dam in 1921.

References

External links
Pearrygin Lake Washington Department of Fish and Wildlife

Lakes of Washington (state)
Lakes of Okanogan County, Washington